The Japanese Invasion of Legazpi (Filipino: Paglusob ng mga Hapones sa Legazpi) on 12 December 1941 was one in a series of advance landings made by Imperial Japanese forces as first step in their invasion of the Philippines. The purpose was to obtain control of local air strips, which could be used as forward bases by fighter aircraft for operations in central Luzon. Control of Legazpi was an important point in the Japanese strategy, as it would also give them control of San Bernardino Strait, between the islands Luzon and Samar, which would prevent the Americans from bringing in reinforcements from the south.
The first invasion was at Batan Island on 8 December 1941. This was followed by Vigan, Aparri, Legazpi, Davao, and Jolo Island over the next few days

Disposition of forces
Legazpi, Albay is the capital of Albay Province, in far southern Luzon at the southern end of the Bicol Peninsula. The city of Legazpi was an important seaport, and the southern terminus of the Manila Railway.

The area of Legazpi was in theory defended by General Wainwright's South Luzon Force with two infantry divisions, the 41st Division to the west and the 51st Division to the east. Moreover, both divisions were undermanned, poorly trained, and suffered from a serious shortage of equipment. In addition, the situation was complicated further in that the enlisted troops spoke only the local Bicol languages, whereas the officers spoke only Tagalog and English.

On the Japanese side, General Homma had organized a detachment of 2500 men from the IJA 16th Division, led by Major General Naoki Kimura, with the Infantry Group HQ, 33rd Infantry Regiment and a battery from the 22nr Field Artillery Regiment. He also had a detachment of 575 men from the Kure 1st SNLF.

Landing and aftermath
By 09:00 they were in control of both the airfield and the railroad. The following day, the Japanese naval covering force withdrew to Palau.

The Philippine 51st Division sent an engineering battalion south into the Bicol Peninsula to destroy bridges and to prevent railroad equipment from falling into the hands of the Japanese. The first American counterattack was a strafing attack on 12 December by two fighter aircraft of the Far East Air Force on the newly captured airstrip at Legazpi, killing three Japanese. This was followed by an attack by three Boeing B-17 Flying Fortress bombers, which destroyed nine Japanese aircraft on legazpi runway. However, only one of the B-17s made it back to its base at Del Monte Airfield.

Once the city of Legazpi was secure, Kimura sent his forces north on Highway 1 to capture the city of Naga, the capital of Camarines Sur Province on 18 December. 
Continuing north from Naga and repairing bridges as they advanced, the Japanese reached the town of Sipocot on 19 December and Daet, capital of Camarines Norte Province on 21 December. General Parker ordered two companies of the 52nd Infantry to make a stand north of Sipocot, as the Bicol Peninsula is very narrow in that area, enabling a small force to considerably delay the Japanese advance. In the early morning of 22 December, a company from the Kimura Detachment engaged the Americans.

However, on 23 December, the Japanese made a landing at Atimonan, the capital of Quezon Province to the north of the American positions. Although thus encircled, a portion of the 52nd Infantry managed to make its way back to American lines.

Consequences
In retrospect, the advance landings by the Japanese in southern Luzon, including at Legazpi, largely accomplished its strategic objective of encircling the American forces in central Luzon, preventing both escape and reinforcement. Tactically, the air fields seized were small, and with the rapid advance of the Japanese into both central and southern Luzon, were soon unnecessary for further operations.

References

Battles and operations of World War II involving the Philippines
History of Albay
Legazpi, Albay
Invasions of the Philippines
Legaspi
World War II invasions
1941 in the Philippines
1941 in military history
History of Camarines Sur
Naga, Camarines Sur
History of Quezon
Amphibious operations of World War II
December 1941 events